The Oakland firestorm of 1991 was a large suburban wildland–urban interface conflagration that occurred on the hillsides of northern Oakland, California, and southeastern Berkeley over the weekend of October 19–20, 1991, before being brought under full control on October 23. The official name of this incident by Cal Fire is the Tunnel Fire. However, it is also commonly referred to as the Oakland Hills firestorm or the East Bay Hills fire. The fire ultimately killed 25 people and injured 150 others. The 1,520 acres (620 ha) destroyed included 2,843 single-family dwellings and 437 apartment and condominium units. The economic loss from the fire was estimated at $1.5 billion ($ in  dollars).

Origins of the fire
The fire started on Saturday, October19, from an incompletely extinguished grass fire in the Berkeley Hills, northeast of the intersection of California State Routes 24 and 13 ( north of the Caldecott Tunnel west portal). Firefighters fought the  fire on a steep hillside above 7151 Buckingham Boulevard, and by Saturday night believed it was under control.

It quickly overwhelmed local and regional firefighting resources. By 11:30 a.m., the fire had spread to the nearby Parkwoods Apartments located next to the Caldecott Tunnel. Shortly before noon, the fire had been blown up to the top of Hiller Highlands to the west, from where it began its sweep down into the Hiller Highlands development and the southern hills of Berkeley. Burning embers from houses and vegetation were carried ahead of the fire line by torrid winds and started new blazes ahead of the original burn. Within thirty minutes the fire had crossed both Highway24, an eight-lane freeway, and Highway13, a four-lane freeway, eventually igniting hundreds of houses in the Forest Park neighborhood on the northwest edge of the Montclair district and in the upper Rockridge neighborhood. The fire eventually touched the edge of Piedmont, burning some municipal property, but the buildings and houses were spared.

The hot, dry northeasterly winds, dubbed as "Diablo winds" in reference to the Diablo mountain range, Diablo Valley, and surrounding geography of same name, periodically occur during the early fall season.  These are similar to the Santa Ana winds in Southern California, and have been the cause of numerous devastating fires. The fire began generating its own wind, the defining characteristic of a firestorm. The superheated fire-driven winds combined with warmer, drier air east of the Berkeley Hills, and interacted with the ambient cooler, more moist Bay/Coastal air to create erratic, dangerous gusts, which  helped produce numerous rotational vortices. All of these combined to help spread the fire, tossing embers in all directions. The wind was so strong that it also blew debris across the bay into San Francisco. Ash fell onto the field of Candlestick Park where the Detroit Lions and San Francisco 49ers were playing during that afternoon. The CBS telecast of the game also showed live footage of the fire. As with the 1989 Loma Prieta earthquake two years earlier, the blimp shots from the national sports media provided many people with first word of the disaster.

By mid-afternoon, the wind had slowed and shifted to the west, driving the fire to the southeast. At about 9:00p.m., the wind abruptly stopped, giving firefighters a chance to contain the fire.

Firefighting response and difficulties

Assistance from firefighting agencies as far north as the Oregon state line, as far south as Bakersfield and as far east as the Nevada state line were delayed initially. Official reports differ between when the Oakland Fire Department made requests, and when the state Department of Forestry and Fire Protection was asked to mobilize air tanker support to the fire zone. Eventually the California Department of Forestry (CDF) was asked to dispatch several air tankers, which doused the fire with tons of fire retardant all day long. The CDF established a base at the Naval Air Station in Alameda. Additionally, the Naval Air Station itself sent its own firefighting equipment and material to the scene of the fire. The next morning, before full control had been gained, satellite photographs, especially infrared (heat-sensing) photographs, were provided with the help of NASA Ames Research Center's Disaster Assistance and Rescue Team (DART) to aid firefighters in plotting the extent of the fire and spotting hidden hot spots.

In terms of alarm assignments, it was the equivalent of a 107-alarm fire.

For a variety of reasons, the firefighting teams were initially overwhelmed by the firestorm. Flames took out power lines to seventeen pumping stations in the Oakland water system. Outside fire teams faced various equipment compatibility issues such as hydrants having the wrong size outlets for the hoses used by neighboring counties. Oakland was also not able to communicate with many mutual aid resources due to antiquated equipment and lack of access to statewide radio frequencies brought on by the budget restrictions in the preceding years. In some areas, firefighters simply ran out of water, as there was no power to refill the emptied reservoirs. Additionally, many narrow, winding roads in the area were crowded with parked cars, including many in front of fire hydrants; this prevented fire trucks and ambulances from getting to certain areas and connecting fire hoses. The general situation was one of chaos and panic among residents in the area.

The most important factor was the rapid spread of the wind-driven fire. Before most of the firefighting resources could be brought to the scene, the fire had established a large perimeter. At the fire's peak, it destroyed one house every 11 seconds. By the first hour, the fire had destroyed nearly 790structures. In addition to the winds and the heat, an important factor in the rapid spread of the fire was that it started in an area that was at an interface between developed and undeveloped land. Many of the first dwellings to burn were surrounded by thick, dry vegetation. In addition, the nearby undeveloped land had even more dry brush. Other factors included many wood shake/shingle roofs which were easily ignited by embers, and the use of wood chip mulch in landscaping around buildings, which was blown around spreading embers and igniting vegetation across streets.

The same conditions contributed to a major conflagration nearby in the 1923 Berkeley fire and a more limited conflagration in the same area on September22, 1970, again under similar conditions. A smaller fire also started in Wildcat Canyon on December14, 1980.

As night descended, the firestorm threatened to destroy the historic Claremont Resort hotel, where the media had gathered to report on the fire. Television crews trained their cameras on the dark hill immediately behind the hotel and millions watched as the fire slowly marched house by house toward the evacuated hotel. The fire was stopped shortly before it reached the hotel.

By 5:00p.m., the winds died down, giving firefighters a chance to control the blaze, though full containment would not be achieved until October22. As many as 400engine companies, 1,500personnel, and 250agencies worked to put out the fire.

By Wednesday, October23, at 8:00a.m., the fire was declared under control, almost 72hours after it started.

Aftermath
The fire's rapid rate of spread and massively-destructive nature sparked renewed recognition of the dangers posed by wildland-urban interface fires in major cities, and spurred research and investigation into improved prevention and suppression of such fires.

Several nonprofit groups arose after the fire. One, the Hills Emergency Forum, was created by local fire agencies to build consensus on fire safety standards and codes, offer multi-jurisdictional training, and coordinate fuel reduction strategies, as well as other goals. At least two citizen groups also arose, the North Hills Phoenix Association and the Claremont Canyon Conservancy to participate in policy decisions and provide educational and stewardship services at the wildland–urban interface. The fire validated that the efforts undertaken by CARD (Collaborating Agencies Responding to Disasters) after the 1989 Loma Prieta earthquake, to build a nonprofit preparedness infrastructure, were key to addressing the needs of vulnerable communities.

In response to issues about firefighting equipment during the disaster, Oakland city firefighters now carry more extensive wildland firefighting gear and fire shelters. Prior to and during this firestorm, when this was not standard equipment, firefighters were sometimes forced to don turn-outs which greatly hampered their ability to move quickly and stay cooler during a wildland fire.

Fire hydrants now have the industry standard  and  inch outlets throughout the city. The lack of a standard in 1991 caused numerous difficulties for various agencies who attempted to connect to non-standard hydrants, even though the  outlets previously used by Oakland were considerably more efficient. Water cisterns and a new hills fire station were added, and radio communications were improved.

In 2015, a $4 million federal grant to prevent fires in the Oakland Hills ignited debate over whether to cut down trees in the region. The city and its fire department say clearing young eucalyptus trees and other non-native plants would deter another deadly firestorm like the one that whipped through the hills in 1991.

One of the most famous victims who lost his house in the disaster was game designer Will Wright, who lived a few blocks away from where the fire started. He used his experience of rebuilding his life as the basis for the concept of the Maxis computer game series The Sims, and added the city's recovery from the fire as a scenario in the game SimCity 2000.

In popular culture
 This disaster was also included as one of several different disaster scenarios in the 1993 video game SimCity 2000.
 The story of the Oakland fire is a major plot element of the children's book Tikvah Means Hope, by Patricia Polacco. New York: Bantam Doubleday Dell Publishing Group, 1994. 
 The 1993 ABC TV movie Firestorm: 72 Hours in Oakland, starring Jill Clayburgh, LeVar Burton and Michael Gross was based on the Oakland Hills fire. It incorporated actual Oakland fire footage as well as audio from radio transmissions made by the fire crews on the scene.
 The book Almost Home: America's Love-Hate Relationship with Community contained a chapter of critical assessment of the social aftermath of the fire. It highlighted how the selfish and individualistic desires by some of the victims of the fire overwhelmed any preliminary voice of community togetherness, including fraudulent and greedy practices towards charity and insurance claims.
 The fire is a theme in author Maxine Hong Kingston's novel The Fifth Book of Peace.
 In the 1998 novel The Metaphysical Touch by Sylvia Brownrigg, the protagonist's home and dissertation are destroyed by the fire.
 The fourteenth and final episode of the American docudrama Critical Rescue is about the Oakland Firestorm, focusing on the experiences of several survivors and also that of Police Officer John William Grubensky, who was killed in the fire, but not before directing traffic as long as possible to give victims a chance to escape.

See also

 1923 Berkeley, California fire
 2021–2022 Boulder County fires
 Camp Fire (2018)
 List of California fires

References

Citations

Additional sources
 NASA Ames Research Center—Disaster Assistance & Rescue Team (DART) response
 Museum of the City of SF—San Francisco Fire Department Responses to the Oakland Fire
 The East Bay Hills Fire: A Multi-Agency Review of the October 1991 Fire in the Oakland/Berkeley Hills. East Bay Hills Fire Operations Review Group, State of California, Governor's Office of Emergency Services, February 27, 1992
 The East Bay Hills Fire: Oakland-Berkeley, California, U.S. Fire Administration, Technical Report Series. USFA-TR-060, October 1991. FEMA.

External links
 FEMA Report
 NASA Aerial Photo of Fire
 http://www.hillsemergencyforum.org/
 http://www.nhphoenix.org/
 https://web.archive.org/web/20080718222157/http://ccconservancy.homestead.com/home.html
 Oakland Firestorm Mural
 Firestorm Memorial Garden
 CBS — video of 1991 Oakland Hills Fire
 Pictures of the 1991 Oakland Hills Firestorm
 Gallery of Oakland Hills fire of 1991
 Images from Oakland fire 1991
 Oakland Firestorm at Twenty
 Flaming Illusions of Reality

1990s wildfires in the United States
1991 fires in the United States
1991 in California
1991 natural disasters in the United States
20th century in Berkeley, California
20th century in Oakland, California
Berkeley Hills
History of Oakland, California
October 1991 events in the United States
Urban fires in the United States
Wildfires in Alameda County, California